Helmut Nentwig (1916–2007) was a German art director.

Selected filmography
 You Can No Longer Remain Silent (1955)
 Bonjour Kathrin (1956)
 The Simple Girl (1957)
 The Big Chance (1957)
 Munchhausen in Africa (1958)
 Escape from Sahara (1958)
 Confess, Dr. Corda (1958)
 The Csardas King (1958)
 And That on Monday Morning (1959)
 The Tiger of Eschnapur (1959)
 The Indian Tomb (1959)
 Here I Am, Here I Stay (1959)
 Mistress of the World (1960)
 Grounds for Divorce (1960)
 The Strange Countess (1961)
 Only a Woman (1962)
 The Terror of Doctor Mabuse (1962)

References

Bibliography
 Bergfelder, Tim. International Adventures: German Popular Cinema and European Co-Productions in the 1960s. Berghahn Books, 2005.

External links

1916 births
2007 deaths
German art directors
Film people from Wrocław